Beth Killough Chapman (born April 6, 1962) is an American politician from Alabama. A member of the Republican Party, she served as the state's 51st secretary of state from 2007 until she resigned on July 31, 2013 in order to accept a position with the Alabama Farmers Federation.

Early life
Beth Killough was born in Greenville, Alabama. Following graduation from Fort Dale Academy, she earned a B.S. from the University of Montevallo, and a master's degree from the University of Alabama at Birmingham.

Political history
From 1995 to 1996, she served as Appointments Secretary in the Cabinet of Governor Fob James, becoming the first woman to serve in that post. During the 2000 presidential election season, she served as a delegate pledged to George W. Bush at the Republican National Convention in Philadelphia, and as a member of Alabama's delegation to the Electoral College later that year. Following a stint in the private sector, she served as Press Secretary for Lieutenant Governor Steve Windom from 2000 to 2001.

Resigning from Lt. Governor Windom's staff in November 2001, she entered the 2002 race for State Auditor of Alabama, scoring an upset victory in the Republican primary, before winning the general election, capturing a seat previously held by Democrat Susan Parker. She served as State Auditor from 2003 to 2007. She was elected as Secretary of State in November 2006, defeating incumbent Nancy Worley by a margin of 57% to 43%. She assumed that office in January 2007. Chapman was mentioned as a possible candidate for Governor of Alabama in the 2010 election.

In early 2008, Chapman became the subject of attacks by Mark Montiel, a Republican former judge.  Montiel sought to have the Alabama Ethics Commission and the Attorney General review tens of thousands of dollars paid by Chapman's 2006 campaign to her husband and sons. Attorney General Troy King, a fellow Republican, announced the complaint against Chapman does not appear to raise any violations of the law. He also wrote that state law does not prohibit a candidate from hiring family members to work in a campaign.  Chapman was cleared by the Ethics Commission on the complaint.

In May 2008, Chapman again made headlines when an Associated Press story revealed that Chapman's personal consulting firm is paid nearly $50,000 annually by a private charity that receives funding from the state government.  Democratic critics attacked Chapman, and Alabama Republicans generally, for engaging in such deals while attacking Democratic legislators holding state jobs.  Chapman denied wrongdoing, and stated that the charity's funds paid to her firm come from fundraising, not its state grants.  The Birmingham News, which had endorsed Chapman in her 2006 campaign, rejected these arguments and sharply criticized her over the issue.

On April 6, 2009, Chapman announced she would seek reelection as Alabama Secretary of State in 2010, and was successful in her bid.

Personal life
In 1988, Killough married James Chapman, with whom she has twin sons, Taylor and Thatcher. Her husband, James Chapman died on April 3, 2011, of acute respiratory distress syndrome (ARDS) at the age of 50. The family lives in Hoover, Alabama.

References

External links
Beth Chapman's website
 

1962 births
Living people
Secretaries of State of Alabama
State cabinet secretaries of Alabama
2000 United States presidential electors
University of Alabama at Birmingham alumni
Women state constitutional officers of Alabama
State Auditors of Alabama
Alabama Republicans
University of Montevallo alumni
People from Greenville, Alabama
People from Hoover, Alabama
2004 United States presidential electors
21st-century American women politicians
21st-century American politicians
20th-century American women politicians
American press secretaries
20th-century American politicians